The 1989 All-Ireland Junior Hurling Championship was the 59th staging of the All-Ireland Junior Championship, the Gaelic Athletic Association's second tier Gaelic football championship.

Meath entered the championship as the defending champions, however, they were beaten by Kildare in the Leinster quarter-final.

The All-Ireland final was played on 10 September 1989 in Coventry, between Cork and Warwickshire, in what was their first meeting in the final in two years. Cork won the match by 0–18 to 0–03 to claim their eighth championship title overall and a first title since 1987.

Cork's Noel Twomey was the championship's top scorer with 1-16.

Results

Leinster Junior Football Championship

Leinster quarter-finals

Leinster semi-finals

Leinster final

Munster Junior Football Championship

Munster quarter-finals

Munster semi-finals

Munster final

All-Ireland Junior Football Championship

All-Ireland home final

All-Ireland final

Championship statistics

Top scorers

Overall

In a single game

References

Junior
All-Ireland Junior Football Championship